Charles William Desmond Carroll (27 January 1919 – 14 February 2012) was the Archdeacon of Blackburn from 1983 to 1985.

Carroll was educated at St Columba's College, Dublin and Trinity College, Dublin. After an earlier career as a school teacher he was Vicar of Stanwix from 1950 to 1959; Director of Religious Education for the Diocese of Blackburn from  1959 to 1964; and a canon residentiary of Blackburn Cathedral from 1964 until his appointment as an archdeacon.

References

1919 births
2012 deaths
People educated at St Columba's College, Dublin
Alumni of Trinity College Dublin
Archdeacons of Blackburn